A charcoal starter is a device or substance to help ignite charcoal fires. It may refer to:

 Chimney starter, a metal tube used with kindling
 Electric charcoal starter, using a heating element
 Charcoal lighter fluid, a flammable fluid